UKSA may refer to:

United Kingdom
 UK Statistics Authority, the board which assures the quality of official statistics
 UK Space Agency, an agency of the government

 UKSA (maritime charity) (previously called UK Sailing Academy), in Cowes, England
 UK Shareholders Association, which represents private shareholders

Elsewhere
 Unió Korfbalera Sant Adrià de Besòs, the korfbal team of Sant Adrià de Besòs city, Catalonia, Spain